The following is a list of films originally produced and/or distributed theatrically by Metro-Goldwyn-Mayer and released between 1960 and 1969.

See also 
 Lists of Metro-Goldwyn-Mayer films

References 

1960-1969
American films by studio
1960s in American cinema
Lists of 1960s films